Frontier West Virginia, Inc. is one of the original Bell Operating Companies and provides local telephone service in the U.S. state of West Virginia.

History

The Chesapeake and Potomac Telephone Company of West Virginia, originally part of the Bell System, was founded on January 1, 1917. C&P of WV took over telephone operations in West Virginia being served by Central District and Printing Telegraph Company, Southern Bell, and The Chesapeake and Potomac Telephone Company of Maryland.

Dial service was first introduced by C&P of West Virginia in 1925 to the Huntington central office.

Bell Atlantic ownership
In 1984, The Chesapeake and Potomac Telephone Company of West Virginia became a holding of Bell Atlantic, upon the divestiture of the Bell System by AT&T.

Charleston became the first city in the United States to have a choice of long-distance companies. By dialing "1" plus the area code and number, they could choose their long-distance carrier. Charleston was the nation's first test market for the service, allowing 34,000 customers to choose from one of eight long-distance companies serving the area.

 
C&P Telephone Co. of WV was the last Bell Atlantic company to provide party line telephone service. The last party line was converted to "private line" service on October 30, 1989.

In 1993, C&P Telephone of West Virginia took its last analog switch out of service, becoming the first Bell Operating Company to have 100% digital switching

Name changes
In 1994, Bell Atlantic standardized all of its Bell Operating Company names, resulting in C&P Telephone of West Virginia being renamed Bell Atlantic - West Virginia, Inc. In 2000, upon its purchase of GTE, Bell Atlantic became Verizon Communications, resulting in the new name Verizon West Virginia, Inc.

Sale to Frontier
On July 1, 2010, Verizon spun off New Communications Holdings, Inc. and its holding company New Communications ILEC Holdings to Verizon shareholders, which then merged with Frontier Communications. Included in the sale was Verizon West Virginia, among other select Verizon landline properties, which became Frontier West Virginia, Inc. The company operates separately from Citizens Telecommunications Company of West Virginia, the existing Frontier provider in the state.

Even though Frontier Communications is not a Baby Bell, the FCC determined that Frontier West Virginia is still bound by laws dating to its time as C&P Telephone of West Virginia; therefore, it is still responsible to uphold obligations expected of Bell Operating Companies outlined in the Telecommunications Act of 1996.

Unique
Frontier West Virginia was the first Bell Operating Company to have been completely divested by a Baby Bell and sold to a non-Baby Bell. Some historically Bell local access lines have been sold to non-Baby Bells over the years by BellSouth, US West, and Verizon; however, the Bell Operating Companies from which those exchanges were split have been retained by the Baby Bells.

AT&T announced on December 17, 2013 that it plans to sell Southern New England Telephone to Frontier Communications. Although SNET is not legally defined as a Bell Operating Company since it was not majority-owned by the original AT&T, it is an original member  of the Bell System and now shares a common affiliation with Frontier West Virginia (via ownership by Frontier) for the first time since 1983.

See also
C&P Telephone
Citizens Telecommunications Company of West Virginia

References

Frontier Communications
Bell System
Telecommunications companies of the United States
History of telecommunications in the United States
Telecommunications companies established in 1917
Communications in West Virginia
1917 establishments in West Virginia